The Pro.Mecc Freccia Anemo is an Italian ultralight aircraft, designed and produced by Pro.Mecc of Corigliano d'Otranto. The aircraft was introduced at the AERO Friedrichshafen show in 2011. The Freccia is supplied as a complete ready-to-fly-aircraft.

Design and development
The Freccia was derived from the earlier Pro.Mecc Sparviero, with additional streamlining and a new elliptical wing planform. It was designed to conform to the Fédération Aéronautique Internationale microlight rules. It features a cantilever low-wing, a two-seats-in-side-by-side configuration enclosed cockpit under a bubble canopy, fixed or, optionally, retractable tricycle landing gear and a single engine in tractor configuration.

The aircraft is made from carbon fibre. Engines available are the  Rotax 912ULS, the turbocharged  Rotax 914 and the  ULPower UL350iS four-stroke powerplant.

Variants
Freccia
Fixed landing gear model, introduced in 2011
Freccia-RG
Retractable landing gear model, introduced in 2012

Specifications (Freccia Anemo)

References

External links

2010s Italian ultralight aircraft
Single-engined tractor aircraft